Garden State Crematory is located at 4101 Kennedy Boulevard in North Bergen, New Jersey. The back of the building overlooks the Weehawken Cemetery and it is adjacent to the Bergen Crest Mausoleum.

History

In the 19th century, the New York and New Jersey Cremation Company performed cremations inside of Becker's Castle, a brownstoned structure on the west side of then 'Hudson Boulevard', now Kennedy Boulevard. In 1907, the company remodeled the building, dividing the roomspaces into thousands of niches for urns and adding a two-story wing to the south side.

Hindu ceremonial expansion
When the demand for the remains of Hindu customers being housed inside the complex during the 1980s to the 1990s rose, a basement room was converted into a small Hindu chapel. An altar was placed in front of a large picture of Shiva; other deities adorning the chapel included Ganesha, Hanuman, Durga and Krishna. It was completed in 1997.

Notable cremations
 Albert Dekker (1905–1968), stage and television actor
 Roy Oscar Miller (1883–1938), Major League Baseball player
 Conrad Nagel (1897–1970), silent film and television actor 
 Madeline Kahn (1942–1999), film and television actress
 Sid Vicious, born John Simon Ritchie, (1957–1979), musician/bassist with Sex Pistols
 Joan Rivers (1933–2014), comedian and actress
 Míriam Colón (1936–2017), Puerto Rican actress
 Kate Spade (1962–2018), American fashion designer and businesswoman

See also
 List of cemeteries in Hudson County, New Jersey

References

External links 
 

North Bergen, New Jersey
Cemeteries in Hudson County, New Jersey
Death care companies of the United States
Art Deco architecture in New Jersey
1907 establishments in New Jersey